Lee Winroth (born 2 September 1998) is a Swedish footballer and weightlifter. In football, she plays as a forward for Sundsvall.

Powerlifting career
Winroth broke a world record for lifting 190 kilograms in a deadlift at the age of 16. This was unofficial, however, as it took place during a training session. Videos of Winroth powerlifting went viral on YouTube. In February 2016, she repeated the feat in a competition, therefore becoming the official world record holder for deadlift.

Personal life
Winroth was diagnosed with scoliosis from a young age.

References

External links 
 

1998 births
Living people
Swedish women's footballers
Damallsvenskan players
Women's association football forwards
Kvarnsvedens IK players
Swedish female weightlifters
21st-century Swedish women